Folliard is a surname. Notable people with the surname include:

Betty Folliard (born 1951), American politician
Edward T. Folliard (1899–1976), American journalist

See also
Tom O'Folliard (1858–1880), American outlaw